The Tylercraft 24, also called the Tyler 24, is an American trailerable sailboat that was designed by Ted Tyler as a cruiser and first built in 1961.

Production
The design was built by Tylercraft in the United States, starting in 1961 and ending about 1980.

Design
The Tylercraft 24 is a recreational keelboat, built predominantly of fiberglass, with wood trim. It has a masthead sloop rig, a spooned raked stem, a nearly-plumb transom, a skeg-mounted rudder controlled by a tiller and a fixed fin keel or twin bilge keels. There were several different models marketed over time, including a daysailer, weekend cruiser and a racer.

The boat is normally fitted with a small  outboard motor mounted in astern well, for docking and maneuvering. Starting in 1965, some boats were equipped with an inboard Wankel engine.

The interior design varied from year to year. A typical layout has sleeping accommodation for four people, with a double "V"-berth in the bow cabin and two straight settee berths in the main cabin. The galley is located on the port side amidships and is equipped with a sink. The head is located opposite the galley on the starboard side.

Operational history
The boat was at one time supported by a class club, Tylercraft sailboats.

See also
List of sailing boat types

References

External links
Brief video of a Tylercraft 24 sailing

Keelboats
1960s sailboat type designs
Sailing yachts 
Trailer sailers
Sailboat type designs by Ted Tyler
Sailboat types built by Tylercraft